Rick Aiello (September 21, 1955 – July 26, 2021) was an American film and television actor. He played Officer Long in the Spike Lee films Do the Right Thing and  Jungle Fever.

Life and career 
Aiello was born on September 21, 1955. He worked as a nightclub bouncer, bartender and club manager, and later pursued his acting career.

Aiello guest-starred in television programs including Diagnosis: Murder, L.A. Law, 21 Jump Street, CSI: Crime Scene Investigation, Early Edition, The Sopranos, Walker, Texas Ranger and 18 Wheels of Justice. He also appeared and co-starred in films such as She Hate Me, Twin Peaks: Fire Walk with Me, The Don's Analyst, Me and the Kid, Hollywood Confidential, Sex and the City, A Brooklyn State of Mind, 29th Street and Silent Madness. Aiello also co-starred in the short-lived American crime drama television series Dellaventura, playing Teddy Naples. He retired in 2016, last appearing in the film Nobody's Perfect.

Aiello died of pancreatic cancer at St. Anthony Community Hospital in Warwick, New York, on July 26, 2021, at the age of 65.

References

External links 

Rotten Tomatoes profile

1955 births
2021 deaths
Place of birth missing
20th-century American male actors
21st-century American male actors
American male film actors
American male television actors
American people of Italian descent
Deaths from cancer in New York (state)
Deaths from pancreatic cancer